Nor Azrina binti Surip (born 25 October 1975) is a Malaysian politician who has served as Member of Parliament (MP) for Merbok since May 2018. She is a member of the People's Justice Party (PKR), a component party of the Pakatan Harapan (PH) and formerly Pakatan Rakyat (PR) opposition coalitions.

Early life and education
Nor Azrina binti Surip was born in Selangor, Malaysia. She received Diploma in Civil Engineering in 1996 and Bachelor of Civil Engineering in 1999 from Universiti Teknologi Malaysia and Master of Science in Environmental Engineering in 2005 from Universiti Sains Malaysia.

Early career
She worked as a research officer in Research Management Centre (RMC), Universiti Teknologi Malaysia, Skudai, Johor from 2001 until 2004. Then, she worked as an environmental engineer at Perunding Mojass, Bandar Darul Aman, Kedah in 2006 and served as the board member for Darulaman Realty Sdn Bhd from 2008 until 2010 and Kedah Sato Sdn Bhd from 2011 until 2012.

Political career
She served as chief woman for Pakatan Harapan in Kedah.

Election results

References

1975 births
Living people
People from Selangor
Malaysian people of Malay descent
Malaysian Muslims
People's Justice Party (Malaysia) politicians
21st-century Malaysian politicians
University of Technology Malaysia alumni
Universiti Sains Malaysia alumni